Apalache is an unincorporated community in Spartanburg County, in the U.S. state of South Carolina.

History
Using a variant spelling of the Apalachee Indian tribe, the community was named for its lofty elevation with view over the Appalachian Mountains. Variant names are "Apalachie Mills", "Appalachie", and "Arlington".

Apalache Mill was added to the National Register of Historic Places in 2015.

References

Unincorporated communities in South Carolina
Unincorporated communities in Spartanburg County, South Carolina